No One Would Tell may refer to:
 No One Would Tell (1996 film), an American teen crime drama television film
 No One Would Tell (2018 film), a remake of the above